The Shadow of Hate is a 1995 American short documentary film about racism directed by Charles Guggenheim. It was nominated for an Academy Award for Best Documentary Short.

Summary
The film expresses the history of oppression, discrimination, violence and hate in America.

References

External links

Excerpt

1994 films
1990s short documentary films
American short documentary films
American independent films
Films directed by Charles Guggenheim
Documentary films about racism in the United States
1994 independent films
1990s English-language films
1990s American films